XHGW-FM is a radio station on 99.3 FM that serves Ciudad Victoria, Tamaulipas, carrying Radio Fórmula programs.

History
XEGW-AM 1380 received its concession on March 25, 1958, and when Jorge Cárdenas González transferred the concession to Enrique Cárdenas González in 1966, it became one of the first stations of ORT. Radio Sistema de Victoria became the concessionaire in 1986, and migration to FM was approved at the end of 2011.

On September 17, 2019, XHGW switched from Imagen Radio to Radio Fórmula programming.

References

Spanish-language radio stations
Radio stations in Ciudad Victoria